All by Myself is a 1943 American comedy film directed by Felix E. Feist and written by Hugh Wedlock Jr. and Howard Snyder. The film stars Rosemary Lane, Evelyn Ankers, Patric Knowles, Neil Hamilton, Grant Mitchell and Louise Beavers. The film was released on June 11, 1943, by Universal Pictures.

Plot

Cast        
Rosemary Lane as Val Stevenson
Evelyn Ankers as Jean Wells
Patric Knowles as Dr. Bill Perry
Neil Hamilton as Mark Turner
Grant Mitchell as J.D. Gibbons
Louise Beavers as Willie
Sarah Edwards as Mrs. Vincent
 Tip, Tap and Toe
Samuel Green as Tip
Ted Fraser as Tap 
Ray Winfield as Toe

References

External links
 

1943 films
American comedy films
1943 comedy films
Universal Pictures films
Films directed by Felix E. Feist
American black-and-white films
1940s English-language films
1940s American films